William Taylor (11 June 1865 – February 28, 1937) was a British inventor noted for his many inventions for improvement of photographic lenses.
 Taylor was president of Institution of Mechanical Engineers, and a Fellow of the Royal Society.

References 

1865 births
1937 deaths
British inventors
Fellows of the Royal Society